Black Thumb is a mountain,  high, with notched and precipitous sides, standing between Romulus Glacier and Bertrand Ice Piedmont on the west coast of Graham Land. It was charted and named by the British Graham Land Expedition under John Rymill, 1934–37.

Further reading 
 United States. Defense Mapping Agency. Hydrographic Center, Sailing Directions for Antarctica: Includes Islands South of Latitude 60°, P 203

External links 

 Black Thumb on USGS website
 Black Thumb on AADC website
 Black Thumb on SCAR website
 Black Thumb current weather
 Black Thumb long term updated weather forecast
 Black Thumb historic weather data

References 
 

Mountains of Graham Land
Fallières Coast